Maria Angelova (1925 – 12 December 1999, Sofia) was a Bulgarian Esperantist and author.

Works 
 Kien ni iras) (Where we are going to), 1991.

References 

1925 births
1999 deaths
Date of birth missing
Place of birth missing
20th-century Bulgarian poets
Writers of Esperanto literature
Bulgarian Esperantists
Bulgarian women poets
20th-century Bulgarian women writers
20th-century Bulgarian writers